Brabourne is a village and civil parish in the Ashford district of Kent, England.

Geography
The village originated around the village church and this area is now usually referred to as East Brabourne. The original village has been outgrown by Brabourne Lees, a development on former common land, closer to the A20 and M20 roads. The western part of the parish is a rural area with scattered farms.

Church

The parish church is dedicated to St Mary the Blessed Virgin; there is also a Zion Strict Baptist Chapel in Brabourne Lees. The church of St. Mary is a building of stone, in the Norman and Early English styles, and has a tower which was restored in 1923-24, containing six bells, increased to eight in 2002. There are numerous monuments to the Scott family, some brasses and several stained glass windows, one of which contains very early glass; the church affords seating for 200. The restoration was carried out by Sir Gilbert Scott.

In popular culture

Author Russell Hoban repurposes Brabourne as "Brabbas Horn" in his 1980, post apocalyptic novel Riddley Walker.

References

External links
Ross, David, Brabourne, Kent, St Mary's Church Retrieved 18 September 2013
Brabourne Parish Council

Borough of Ashford
Civil parishes in Ashford, Kent
Villages in Kent